"Realize" is a song by Japanese pop singer Konomi Suzuki. It was released as her eighteenth single on August 26, 2020. It reached number 38 on Oricon and number 86 on Japan Hot 100. It was used as the opening theme to the second season of Re:Zero − Starting Life in Another World. This single was originally scheduled to be released on May 13, 2020, but was delayed due to the postponement of the anime because of the COVID-19 pandemic.

Release
On 15 January 2020, the official website of the anime Re:Zero − Starting Life in Another World revealed about the opening theme song "Realize" would be sung by Konomi Suzuki. The single was released on 26 August 2020. The single was originally scheduled to be released on May 13, 2020, but was delayed due to the postponement of the anime because of the COVID-19 pandemic. The single reached number 38 on Oricon, 86 on Japan Hot 100, and 8 on Japan Hot Animation.

Music video
The music video for "Realize" was directed by Hiro. The video show Konomi Suzuki singing the song with fire effects surrounding her (red and blue flames). Some scenes also show her holding the flower, and also she sings with a grey background.

Track listing

Regular edition

Charts

Release history

References

2020 singles
Anime songs
2020 songs